LTI can refer to:
 LTI – Lingua Tertii Imperii, a book by Victor Klemperer
 Language Technologies Institute, a division of Carnegie Mellon University
 Linear time-invariant system, an engineering theory that investigates the response of a linear, time-invariant system to an arbitrary input signal
 Licensed to Ill, the 1986 debut album by the Beastie Boys
 Lost Time Incident or industrial injury or Occupational injury
 Learning Tools Interoperability
 Louisiana Training Institute-East Baton Rouge, later known as the Jetson Center for Youth (JCY), a juvenile prison in Louisiana

Companies 
 London Taxis International
 Larsen & Toubro Infotech

Biology and medicine 
 Lymphoid tissue-inducer cell, see innate lymphoid cells